Jean-Pierre Rousselot (14 October 1846, Saint-Claud – 16 December 1924, Paris) was a French priest who was an important phonetician and dialectologist.

Rousselot is considered the founder of experimental phonetics, both theoretical and applied, as manifested in the two volumes of his Principes de Phonétique Expérimentale (1897, 1901). He influenced many phoneticians and linguists, including Josef Chlumsky, Jean Poirot, Giulio Panconcelli-Calzia, Théodore Rosset, George Oscar Russell, Raymond Herbert Stetson, and Lev Shcherba.

With Hubert Pernot, he was editor of the journal Revue de phonétique.

Selected works 
 De vocabulorum congruentia in rustico cellae-fruini sermone, 1892.
 La Phonétique expérimentale, 1897.
 Études de prononciations parisiennes, 1899.
 Historique des applications pratiques de la phonétique expérimentale, 1899.
 Principes de phonétique expérimentale (2 volumes).
 Précis de prononciation française, 1902.
 Premiers éléments de prononciation française, 1903.

References 

1846 births
1924 deaths
French non-fiction writers
French Roman Catholic priests
Phoneticians
Dialectologists
Burials at Père Lachaise Cemetery
French male non-fiction writers
People from Charente